Walter Brandmüller (born 5 January 1929) is a German prelate of the Catholic Church, a cardinal since 2010. He was president of the Pontifical Committee for Historical Sciences from 1998 to 2009.

Early life
Brandmüller was born in 1929 in Ansbach, Germany. His father was Roman Catholic and his mother was Protestant. Brandmüller was baptized as a Protestant and converted to Roman Catholicism from Lutheranism in his adolescence. He studied at the Ludwig-Maximilians University in Munich in 1963, he earned a doctorate in history (doctoral thesis: "Das Wiedererstehen katholischer Gemeinden in den Fürstentümern Ansbach und Bayreuth", 'The reestablishment of Catholic parishes in the princedoms of Ansbach and Bayreuth'); and he obtained the "habilitation" in 1967 with the dissertation "Das Konzil von Pavia-Siena (1423–1424)" ('The council of Pavia-Siena').

Priest and academic
On 26 July 1953, he was ordained a priest in Bamberg by Joseph Otto Kolb, Archbishop of Bamberg. He did pastoral work in the church of Saint John, Kronach, 1953–1957, and in that of Saint Martin, Bamberg, 1957–1960. Thereafter he did further studies in Munich. He served as Professor of Church History and Patrology at the University of Dillingen from 30 October 1969 until 1971. From 7 October 1970 until his retirement in 1997 he was Professor of Modern and Medieval Church History at the University of Augsburg. From 1971 until 1998, he was parish priest of the Assumption, Walleshausen, Diocese of Augsburg.

A specialist in the history of the councils, he is founder and editor of the journal Annuarium conciliorum historiae (Paderborn, 1969); and of the series "Konziliengeschichte" (1979), which has published 37 volumes so far. He also published the "Handbook of Bavarian Church History" (St. Ottilie, 1991–1999, 3 vols. in 4). From 1981 to 1998, he was a member of the Pontifical Committee for Historical Sciences. He was appointed Honorary Prelate on 17 July 1983. On 22 July 1990, he received the Cross of the Order of Merit of the Federal Republic of Germany from president Richard von Weizsäcker. He served as President of the International Commission for Contemporary Church History from 1998 until 2006. He has been a canon of the chapter of the Saint Peter's Basilica since 1997. From 13 June 1998 until 3 December 2009, he was President of the Pontifical Committee for Historical Sciences.

Cardinal
On 20 November 2010 Pope Benedict XVI elevated Brandmüller to the College of Cardinals as Cardinal-Deacon of S. Giuliano dei Fiamminghi. Before being made a cardinal, as required by canon law, he received episcopal consecration on 13 November from Cardinal Raffaele Farina, Archivist and Librarian of the Holy Roman Church, assisted by Ludwig Schick, Archbishop of Bamberg and Giuseppe De Andrea.

In September 2016, Brandmüller, along with Cardinals Carlo Caffarra, Raymond Burke and Joachim Meisner, submitted to Pope Francis a private letter with five dubia (questions) seeking clarification on various points of doctrine in the Pope's apostolic exhortation Amoris laetitia. The first dubium concerned the reception of the sacraments by the divorced and remarried; the other four asked about fundamental issues of the Christian life, and referenced Pope John Paul II's encyclical Veritatis splendor. In November 2016, having not received a response, they publicised their letter, entitled "Seeking Clarity: A Plea to Untie the Knots in Amoris Laetitia".

In May 2017, Caffarra, Brandmüller, Burke and Meisner sent a private letter dated 25 April and hand-delivered to the Pope on 6 May asking for an audience, having received no response to the dubia they had earlier sent him in September 2016. Having received no response, they made their letter public in June 2017. Two cardinals later died that year: Meisner on 5 July; and Caffara on 6 September.

In February 2019, Brandmüller and Burke penned an open letter addressed to Pope Francis calling for an end of "the plague of the homosexual agenda", which they blamed for the sexual abuse crisis engulfing the Catholic Church. They claimed the agenda was spread by "organized networks" protected by a "conspiracy of silence". After ten years at the rank of cardinal deacon, he exercised his option to assume the rank of cardinal priest, which Pope Francis confirmed on 3 May 2021.

Select published works 
 Das Konzil von Konstanz 1414–1418. 2 vol. Schöningh, Paderborn:
 Band 1: Bis zur Abreise Sigismunds nach Narbonne, 1991, 2. extended Ed. 1999, .
 Band 2: Bis zum Konzilsende, 1998, .
 Das Konzil von Pavia-Siena 1423–1424. Schöningh, Paderborn 2002, .
 Briefe um das I. Vaticanum. Aus der Korrespondenz des Konzilssekretärs Bischof Fessler von St. Pölten 1869–1872. Schöningh, Paderborn 2005, .
 "Unity and Indissolubility of Marriage: From the Middle Ages to the Council of Trent", in: Robert Dodaro (Ed.), Remaining in the Truth of Christ: Marriage and Communion in the Catholic Church, Ignatius Press, San Franzisco 2014. S. 129–147. German Edition: Robert Dorado (Ed.), In der Wahrheit Christi bleiben. Ehe und Kommunion in der Katholischen Kirche, Echter, Würzburg 2014, . (Contents and editorial of the original online available, in the editorial the abstract of the essay from Brandmüller p. 15–24). The anthology is a reply to Walter Kasper, Das Evangelium von der Familie. Die Rede vor dem Konsistorium, Verlag Herder Freiburg, Basel, Wien 2014, .
 "Renuntiatio Papae - einige historisch-kanonistische Überlegungen", in: Johannes Grohe, Gregor Wurst, Zvjezdan Strika, Hermann Fischer (eds.), Begegnung der Kirche in Ost und West im Spiegel der synodalen Strukturen. Historisch-theologische Beiträge (= Festschrift Petar Vrankić zum 70. Geburtstag), EOS Verlag Erzabtei St. Ottilien, Sankt Ottilien 2017, pp. 65–80.

References

External links

 

1929 births
Living people
21st-century German cardinals
Ludwig Maximilian University of Munich alumni
Cardinals created by Pope Benedict XVI
Converts to Roman Catholicism from Lutheranism
Recipients of the Cross of the Order of Merit of the Federal Republic of Germany
People from Ansbach